Attardo is an Italian surname. Notable people with the surname include:

Salvatore Attardo (born 1962), Belgian–Italian linguist and academic
Tyler Attardo (born 2001), Canadian soccer player

Italian-language surnames